The 50th Military Airlift Squadron is an inactive United States Air Force unit. Its last assignment was to the 1502d Air Transport Wing, Military Air Transport Service, stationed at Hickam Air Force Base, Hawaii.

It was inactivated on 8 January 1966.

History
Replaced the 1266th Air Transport Squadron, which had been established in 1949 as a medium transport squadron flying C-54 Skymasters, it transported supplies and personnel in the Pacific between Hawaii and the Philippines and bases in-between. It received long distance Boeing C-97 Stratofreighters and intercontinental Douglas C-124 Globemaster IIs in the 1950s and was part of the Military Air Transport Service worldwide network of transport units. It flew routes between India and the West Coast of the United States, Alaska and Japan.

It was reassigned to the 61st Military Airlift Wing in 1966 when its parent 1502d Air Transport Wing was inactivated.

Lineage
 Constituted as the 50th Ferrying Squadron (Special)
 Activated c. 1 August 1942
 Redesignated 50th Transition Training Squadron on 4 June 1943
 Disbanded on 31 March 1944
 Reconstituted on 20 June 1952 as the 50th Air Transport Squadron, Heavy
 Activated on 20 July 1952
 Redesignated 50th Military Airlift Squadron on 8 January 1966
 Inactivated on 22 December 1969

Assignments
 1st Operational Training Unit, c. 1 August 1942 – 31 March 1944
 1500th Air Transport Group (later 1502d Air Transport Group), 20 July 1952
 1502d Air Transport Wing, 1 May 1958
 61st Military Airlift Wing 8 January 1966 – 22 December 1969 (not operational after 1 December 1969)

Stations
 Rosecrans Field, Missouri, c. 1 August 1942 – 31 March 1944
 Hickam Air Force Base, Hawaii, 20 July 1952 – 22 December 1969

Aircraft
 C-54 Skymaster, 1949–1952
 C-97 Stratofreighter, 1952–1955
 C-124 Globemaster II, 1955–1966

References

Notes

Bibliography

 
 
 

Military units and formations in Hawaii
0050